Malaysia competed in the 1966 Asian Games held in Bangkok, Thailand from 9 December 1966 to 20 December 1966. This country is ranked number 4 with 7 gold medals, 5 silver medals and 6 bronze medals.

Medal summary

Medals by sport

Medallists

Athletics

Men
Track events

Field event

Women
Track events

Badminton

Basketball

Men's tournament
Group A

Fifth to eighth place classification

Seventh and eighth place match

Ranked 8th in final standings

Boxing

Field hockey

Men's tournament
Group B

Semifinal

Bronze medal match

Ranked 4th in final standings

Football

Men's tournament
Group B

Ranked 10th in final standings

Volleyball

Men's tournament
Pool A

|}

|}

Seventh to twelfth place classification

|}

|}

Ranked 12th in final standings

Water polo

Men's tournament
Final round

Ranked 4th in final standings

References

Nations at the 1966 Asian Games
1966
Asian Games